Crowhurst may refer to:

Places
Crowhurst, East Sussex, England
Crowhurst railway station
Crowhurst, Surrey, England

People
 Donald Crowhurst (1932–1969), English businessman and amateur sailor
 Geoff Crowhurst was a South Australian actor and director, notably at Junction Theatre Company
William Crowhurst (1849–1915), English cricketer

Other
 Crowhurst (band), rock music group
Crowhurst (film), a 2017 film about Donald Crowhurst